Valdemarsvik is a locality, situated alongside the bay of Valdemarsviken which connects to the Baltic Sea. It is the seat of Valdemarsvik Municipality which is located in Östergötland County, Sweden. The coastal area is a popular summer destination, particularly with Swedish tourists.

History

Valdemarsvik is surrounded by water. However, after the end of the last glacial period, it lay beneath the sea level. As a result of post-glacial rebound, the water withdrew as the land rose. The resulting appearance of fertile soil drew settlers in the Bronze Age, around 1500 BC. The surrounding archipelago has had a bloody history: remains of shipwrecks at the bottom of the sea and Viking era remnants witness of battles from that time. Industrialization occurred during the 1630s, when Valdemarsvik became a trade port for copper and leather; one of Sweden's largest tanneries was located in Valdemarsvik. The town's name was first mentioned in 1664.

Tourism and entertainment
Sailing to the Gryt archipelago to swim and fish is a popular summertime activity. Boat excursions and jetski rentals are also available.
"No one I know who has experienced Gryt's archipelago disagrees with me saying: It has been — and is — a blessing to experience this archipelago, this living porch, stretching out into the endless ocean." - Henning Mankell, author and seasonal resident of the archipelago of Gryt.

Other recreational activities include bicycle rentals, golf, cinemas, canoeing, riding, and museums. The internationally famed glass artist, sculptor and painter Milan Wobruba has a studio, where visitors have the opportunity to be involved in glass blowing and the manufacture of glass. An "October Market", held every October 4, is both a market, with a range of goods to be sold, and a fair, featuring acrobats, cotton candy, live music and various amusement rides.

There are plenty of restaurants and cafés to visit in the municipality. Many of them are open all year round but there are also those that are only open during the summer. Also, each year there is exists a special "food competition". Dishes are to be made, the ingredients should, as far as possible, be locally produced and which a jury then assesses. The winner will then have his or her dish served at most restaurants in the municipality.

Sports
The following sports clubs are located in Valdemarsvik:

 Valdemarsviks IF

References

External links 

Populated places in Östergötland County
Municipal seats of Östergötland County
Swedish municipal seats
Market towns in Sweden
Populated places in Valdemarsvik Municipality